Guraidhoo (Dhivehi: ގުރައިދޫ) is one of the inhabited islands of Kaafu Atoll in the Maldives.

Geography
It is located in South Malé Atoll.

Demography

Economy

Infrastructure
Guraidhoo has about 1,800 locals but the population can rise to over 2,500 as Guraidhoo  has the only psychiatric facility in Maldives.
On 26 March 2021 BML introduces Self-Service Banking in Kaafu Guraidhoo.

Sport
Guraidhoo is  recognized for its surfing and turtle snorkeling, dolphins, sand banks, and diving spots plus wind surfing water sports and dolphin back riding

Transport
The public ferry takes 45 min to reach Guraidhoo.

Speedboat ferry: 
Guaraidhoo to Male
Male to Guaraidhoo

Local direct ferry:
Guaraidhoo to Male
Male to Guaraidhoo

Local province ferry (Transit)
Guraidhoo to Male
Male to Guraidhoo

References

Islands of the Maldives